Papercuts Theater is a live album by Burning Star Core, released on March 9, 2010 by No Quarter Records.

Track listing

Personnel
Adapted from the Papercuts Theater liner notes.

Burning Star Core
 Robery Beatty – electronics
 Jeremy Lesniak – electronics, percussion
 John Rich – guitar
 Mike Shiflet – electronics, computer
 C. Spencer Yeh – violin, electronics, voice, editing
 Trevor Tremaine – drums, percussion

Additional musicians
 Russell Beebe – horn (3)
 Mike Connelly – voice (3)
 Lambsbread – guitar (3), drums (3)
 Dave Rempis – alto saxophone (3)
 Jim Reynolds – electronics (2-4), percussion (2-4)
 Craig Shepard – trombone (3)
Production and additional personnel
 Paul Romano – cover art, art direction, design
 Carl Saff – mastering

Release history

References

External links 
 

2010 live albums
Burning Star Core albums